Eumasia is a small genus of the bagworm moth family, Psychidae. Therein, it belongs to the tribe Apteronini of the subfamily Oiketicinae.

Species
Species of Eumasia include:
 Eumasia brunella Hattenschwiler 1996
 Eumasia crisostomella (Amsel, 1957)
 Eumasia muscella Saigusa & Sugimoto, 2005
 Eumasia parietariella (Heydenreich, 1851)
 Eumasia viridilichenella Saigusa & Sugimoto, 2005

Footnotes

References

  (2009): Eumasia. Version 2.1, 2009-DEC-22. Retrieved 2010-MAY-08.
  (2004): Butterflies and Moths of the World, Generic Names and their Type-species – Eumasia. Version of 2004-NOV-05. Retrieved 2010-MAY-08.

Psychidae
Psychidae genera